P. abbreviata may refer to: 

Polycentropsis abbreviata, the African leaffish
Prosopis abbreviata, a flowering plant in the pea family